A taco is a traditional Mexican dish.

Taco may also refer to:

People
 Taco (given name), a list of people with the given name or nickname
 Taco (musician), Indonesian-born Dutch singer Taco Ockerse (born 1955)
 Taco Hemingway, stage name of Polish rapper, songwriter, and musician Filip Tadeusz Szcześniak (born 1990)
 Travis Taco Bennett, American rapper
 "Taco", an alias of Harry Joseph Bowman (1949–2019), American criminal and former international president of the Outlaws Motorcycle Club

Arts and entertainment
 Taco, a character on American television sitcom The League 
 "Tacos" (The Balham Alligators song)

Other uses
 Transfusion associated circulatory overload (TACO), a transfusion medicine complication
 Bete-ombro, also known as taco, a Brazilian game related to cricket
 14917 Taco, an asteroid

See also
 Taco rice, an Okinawan food
 French tacos, a French food
 Tako (disambiguation)
 Tacko Fall (born 1995), Senegalese basketball player